Prizm may refer to:

 Casio Prizm, a series of graphing calculators
 Claritas Prizm, a marketing database used in the United States
 Geo Prizm, a car by Chevrolet
 Prizm Outlets, a shopping center in Nevada, US
 Prizm Project, a human rights education program for young women
 FDB Prizm, a medical device database maintained by First Databank
 Probing Radio Intensity at high-Z from Marion, a radio astronomy experiment run by the South African National Antarctic Programme

See also
 Prism (disambiguation)